Club Deportivo San Roque is a Spanish football team based in San Roque, Cádiz, in the autonomous community of Andalusia. Founded in 1966, it plays in Tercera División – Group 10, holding home matches at Estadio Manolo Mesa, with a 500-seat capacity.

Season to season

6 seasons in Tercera División

External links
Official website 
Futbolme team profile 

Football clubs in Andalusia
Association football clubs established in 1966
1966 establishments in Spain